The 2007 BWF Super Series was the inaugural season of the BWF Super Series. It was held from January 16 with Malaysia Open and end on December 2, 2007. It was expected to end on December 23, 2007 with Super Series Finals; this event was postponed and later cancelled due to an uncertain circumstance.

Schedule

Venue and date for the Super Series Final still uncertain after Qatar failed to get enough sponsorship to support the event. It supposed to be held on January 2, to January 6, 2008, however once again it was delayed by Badminton World Federation to an uncertain date. The tournament was eventually canceled.

Results

Winners

Performances by countries
Tabulated below are the Super Series performances based on countries. Only countries who have won a title are listed:

Super Series Rankings
After Hong Kong Open Super Series

Leader progress
Tabulated below are the leader progress in Super Series ranking towards the Super Series Final in December:

Men's singles

Women's singles

Men's doubles

Women's doubles

Mixed doubles

References

 
BWF Super Series